The Victorian Artists Society, which can trace its establishment to 1856 in Melbourne, promotes artistic education, art classes and gallery hire exhibition in Australia. It was formed in March 1888 when the Victorian Academy of Arts (previously Victorian Society of Fine Arts) and the Australian Artists' Association amalgamated.

The Victorian Artists’ Society is a not-for-profit organisation and charity registered with the Victorian government. The Artists' Society routinely practices a range of art forms and styles through classes and gatherings in their permanent home, a heritage-listed bluestone building on Albert Street, Melbourne. As of 2021, the Victorian Artists' Society premises include four galleries, members’ rooms, an administrative office, and the original bluestone studio which operates as an art school. The original studio was not finished until 1902.

The general public can view the seasonal collections of artworks in the gallery or buy artworks. The gallery is open seven days a week and the cost is free entry. New exhibitions are held fortnightly within the five galleries.

History
The Victorian Society of Fine Arts, a forerunner to the Victorian Academy of Arts, was established in 1856. The Victorian Academy of Arts was formed in 1870 with "about twenty artists and amateurs" amongst its first members, including Eliezer Levi Montefiore.

The Australian Artists' Association held its first exhibition in 1886, with works by Tom Roberts, Louis Buvelot, Frederick McCubbin, and Arthur Streeton.

In March 1888 the Academy and the Association amalgamated, creating the Victorian Artists Society. The founding president of the new Society was Joseph Anderson Panton; later presidents included Frederick McCubbin and Paul Raphael Montford.

The premises at 430 Albert Street in East Melbourne were erected for the society in 1888, enlarged in 1892 and modernised in 1953. Facilities include four galleries, teaching studio, members room, offices and other ancillary facilities.

During its early establishment, the Artists’ Society met in a private house in St. Kilda. Its founding members included landscape painter Louis Buvelot, painter Hubert de Castella and etcher J.A. Panton. The Artists’ Society was known for throwing parties and picnics at Brighton. By the 1890s, there were 400 members.

This historical building was not limited to fine arts and was also established as a music conservatory that offered singing lessons by Nellie Melba. Melba taught music lessons at the historical building from 1915 until close to her death in 1931. She would perform to crowds outside from the balcony of the house. In 2014, the Society honoured Melba with a special plaque for the gallery to record her musical history at the Victorian Artists’ Society.
The Artists’ Society was a starting point for young artists of the Heidelberg school, a Victorian impressionist art movement of the 19th century, to exhibit their work and make their first major sales. Artists of the Heidelberg school who were active members of the Victorian Artists’ Society included Charles Conder, Frederick McCubbin, Arthur Streeton, and Tom Roberts.

Max Meldrum, the Victorian Artists’ Society president in 1917, taught tonal realism at the gallery studio. In 1918 he left the Victorian Artists’ Society to form ‘The Society of Twenty Melbourne Painters’. Meldrum ran this society in its early stages from his studio in Hardware Chambers, Elizabeth Street, Melbourne. They later changed their name to Twenty Melbourne Painters Society.

Most of the early exhibitors in the Society were women.

Albert Tucker, an Australian artist, and member of the Heide Circle, went to night art classes at the Victorian Artists’ Society studio in the 1930s.

In 1938, at a VAS meeting, artists interested in contemporary styles decided to form Contemporary Artists’ Society (CAS). CAS is still active.

Today
As of 2021

The Victorian Artists Society is a gallery and public learning centre offering public exhibitions, art lessons, gallery space for hire, workshops, and paid opportunities for working Victorian artists.

Art classes and workshops are offered to a minimum age of 16 and operate in four term sessions a year. Classes include painting, watercolour, pastel, oil, acrylic, drawing, and sculpture. 18 different art classes are offered each week in the studio. The gallery viewing hours operate from 10am to 4pm Monday to Friday, and 1pm to 4pm on Saturday and Sunday. The gallery is closed on public holidays. Classes are held in the studio six days a week.

Membership is restricted to 1000, a figure last reached in 1979, and is open for new members to join for approximately $90. Membership is open to all persons interested in the fine arts, with the emphasis on practising artists.

As of 2021, the current society president is Eileen Mackley, who joined the VAS board 29 December 2008, and was appointed president 5 December 2013. Ron Smith is head of media enquiries.

Exhibitions are held annually, including the seasonal spring, summer, autumn and winter exhibitions, with awards given at each. Every year, the society presents the ‘Mavis Little VAS Artist of the Year Award’ to the artist receiving the most votes from exhibitors through that year.

In 2020, The Victorian Artists’ Society launched an online art gallery called ‘Art for Sale,’ creating the opportunity for local Victorian artists to sell their works to a domestic and international online audience. The mediums of art for sale included paintings, sculptures, prints and digital art. This free of charge online event ran from 26 August to 31 December 2020.

In 2020, the Victorian Artists’ Society celebrated their 150th anniversary. The society released with historical information, drawings, and photographs, titled ‘VICTORIAN ARTISTS SOCIETY 1870 – 2020 CELEBRATING 150 YEARS’, edited by Rosemary Noble. To celebrate 150 years of the Artists’ Society on March 10, 2020, the Governor of Victoria, Linda Dessau AC, gave a speech saying “almost every notable Australian painter from the late 19th to early 20th centuries was associated with the VAS. Fortunately for the people of Victoria, and thanks to the National Gallery of Victoria, many of their works grace the walls at Government House.”

Building Restoration 

The Victorian Artists’ Society building is Heritage and National Trust listed. In 1873, a grant of land on Albert street became available and allowed for a modest structure. The building is opposite St. Patrick's Cathedral and 600m from Parliament House. According to Professor Miles Lewis of the Australian Architectural Index, the building was originally one-story with measurements of 14.3m x 9.1 x 6m, built by Corben & Stuart. The Romanesque-style building was originally designed by architect Leonard Terry, a designer of warehouses and banks, and Richard Speight.

The house underwent renovations in the late 1970s, installing fluorescent lighting, which they later changed again. Although the building has been renovated, the original 1873 studio and 1892 staircase, galleries, and balcony remain. The original Baltic pine floor, tables, and easels still remain the same. An elevator has been added.

In 2015, the historic building was threatened by severe water damage and needed urgent restoration repairs for a cost of approximately $1 million. The building needed cosmetic attention, roof restoration, replastering, replumbing, and new electricity installed. The society began the restoration funded entirely by donations and money raised. In May 2015, twenty of the society's artists participated in a mass portrait painting called “People Painting People,” with several well-known members of the public, including former Victorian Police commissioner Ken Lay, as the artist subjects. This fundraiser event and multiple others contributed to the money raised for the building restoration. Australian arts and heritage consultant, Tracey Avery advised and reported on paint finishes, new colour schemes and prepared for approval by Heritage Victoria. After approximately five years of renovations and $2.5 million raised by both members and donors, the building restoration was complete.

Finances 
The Victorian Artist's Society is a non-for-profit and charitable organisation as of its registration in 2012. Many members of the society council work on a volunteer basis. The Society's President, Eileen Mackley, is the VAS Treasurer.

According to the Australian Charities and Not-for-profits Commission AIS report published 30 July 2020, 9.46% of the total gross income of the Victorian Artists’ Society was from donations and bequests. In the year 2020, over $650,000 of the society's gross income was from donations and bequests, which in large part paid for the completion of the building restoration. Approximately 91.64% of their total expenses is on employee salaries. In 2020, the year of COVID-19, there were no significant changes in the company's activity during the financial year.

Working Artists in Victoria 

After the amalgamation forming the Victorian Artists’ Society in 1888, distinguished artists associated with the Victorian Artists’ Society included Tom Roberts, Charles Conder, and Arthur Streeton. Arthur Ernest Streeton painted ‘Settler’s Camp’ and ‘Pastoral’, both exhibited and sold at the Victorian Artists Society in 1888. He took inspiration for his portraits from the Yarra River and its bridges. After his time at the Victorian Artists Society, Streeton worked for the Royal Academy of Arts in London in 1891. Tom Roberts, alongside Streeton a former member of the Artists’ Society has been called the founder of Australian Impressionism. Both artists regularly exhibited oil paintings.

Charles Conder studied at the Art Society School during the 1880s where he exhibited his impressionist painting ‘Departure of the Orient – Circular Quay’ in 1888. Conder sold this painting to the Art Gallery of New South Wales that same year, before leaving to work with Streeton in Melbourne and joining the Victorian Artists’ Society. After joining the Society, he exhibited paintings ‘Coogee Bay’ 1888, and ‘A Holiday at Mentone’ 1888. Conder, along with Roberts, McCubbin, and Streeton became contributors to The 9 by 5 Impressionism Exhibition in August 1889. This exhibition represented impressions of bushlands and city life during a formative period of national Australian history.

Esther Paterson, born in 1893, was the longest-serving female office bearer of the Victorian Artist's Society. She was also an active member of the Melbourne Society of Women Painters and Sculptors. Similar to the Victorian Artists’ Society, the Melbourne Society of Women Painters and Sculptors, founded in 1902, is the oldest organisation for women artists in Australia. Many members of the Victorian Artists Society are also members of the Melbourne Society of Women Painters and Sculptors.

Similar societies to the Victorian Artists’ Society which provide opportunities and exhibitions for working artists in Victoria include Hawthorn Artist Society, Heidelberg Artists Society, and Twenty Melbourne Painters Society.

Exhibitions and Awards 
The Victorian Artists’ Society holds changing exhibitions throughout the year. In the five galleries, new exhibitions are held every two to three weeks. Exhibitions range from retrospective exhibitions of former VAS members to acrylic landscapes to contemporary works focusing on the raw beauty of nature. The Artists' Society holds eleven awarded exhibitions a year for members including, Mavis Little VAS Artist of the Year Award, The Norma Bull Portraiture Scholarship, The VAS George Hicks Foundation Contemporary Exhibition, VAS Autumn Select Exhibition, VAS Maritime Exhibition, VAS Portrait Exhibition, VAS Spring Select Exhibition, and the VAS Winter Select Exhibition. The Mavis Little Artist of the Year Award is a $10,000 prize and solo exhibition and is sponsored by the Hansen Little Foundation.

The Artist of the Year Award was introduced by Robert Miller in 1973.

In October 2019, the newly renovated Victorian Artists’ Society hosted “FIVE Exhibition” by the FIVE Melbourne Art Group. This exhibition included landscapes, streetscapes, and portrait paintings from Ted Dansey, Mary Hyde, Julian Bruere, John Hunt, and Lucille Tam. This exhibition was free entry.

List of Notable Members

Founders (1888) 

 Joseph Anderson Panton
 Louis Buvelot
 Thomas Clark
 Hubert De Castella

Presidents 

 2021 Richard Impey
 2013 Eileen Mackley
 2011 Gregory R Smith
 2007 Noel Waite
 2003 John Hunt
 1998 Paul McDonald Smith
 1995 Kathlyn Ballard
 1991 Arthur William Harding
 1988 Connie Walker
 1983 David Roper
 1980 Dorothy Baker
 1977 Edward Heffernan
 1972 Stanley Hammond
 1964 William Frater
 1962 Laurence Scott Pendlebury
 1959 Arnold Shore
 1951 Malcolm Warner
 1948 James Quinn
 1946 Orlando Dutton
 1937 James Quinn
 1935 John Rowell
 1933 Louis McCubbin
 1931 Paul Montford
 1926 Charles Douglas Richardson
 1925 John Longstaff
 1918 Charles Douglas Richardson
 1917 Max Meldrum
 1912 William Montgomery
 1911 John Mather
 1910 Frederick Horatio Bruford
 1909 Frederick McCubbin
 1906 John Mather
 1905 Walter Withers
 1903 Frederick McCubbin
 1902 John Ford Paterson
 1893 John Mather
 1888 Joseph Anderson Panton
 1875 Chester Earles
 1870 Oswald Rose Campbell

Current Directors 

 Hylton Mackley
 Meg Davoren Honey
 Ron C Smith
 Radmila Hardi
 Bruce Baldey
 Rosemary Noble
 John Hurle
 Maxine Waine
 Fred Toumayen
 Rachel Robertson
 Sue Ireland
 Jennifer Fyfe
 Richard Impey

Distinguished Artists 
 Karl Duldig
 Arthur Streeton
 Tom Roberts
 Charles Conder
 Esther Paterson
Frederick McCubbin
Louis Buvelot

References 
 Germaine Max – Artists and Galleries of Australia (1984) Boolarong Publications

External links
Victorian Artists Society

Arts in Victoria (Australia)
Art societies
Australian artist groups and collectives
Organisations based in Melbourne
East Melbourne, Victoria